The Diamond School near Christiansted, Virgin Islands was built in approximately 1840 and was listed on the National Register of Historic Places in 1976.

It is notable as one of eight "von Scholten schools", which were built by Governor-General Peter von Scholten to improve conditions for slaves.  The eight schools were identical and were designed by Albert Løvmand, who studied at Royal Academy of Fine Arts in Copenhagen.

The schools have a single main room, so are essentially one-room schoolhouses.

References

National Register of Historic Places in the United States Virgin Islands
School buildings on the National Register of Historic Places
One-room schoolhouses in the United States
Buildings and structures completed in 1840
Schools in the United States Virgin Islands
1840s establishments in the Caribbean